George Banton (1856 - 19 April 1932) was a Labour politician in England.

A long-serving alderman in Leicester, and leader of the Labour Party in Leicester,
Banton was elected as the Member of Parliament (MP) Leicester East at a by-election March 1922.
He made his maiden speech on 4 April, about old-age pensions.

He was defeated at the general election in November 1922.

He regained the seat at the 1923 general election, but was defeated again at the 1924 general election.

References

External links 
 

1856 births
1932 deaths
Independent Labour Party National Administrative Committee members
Labour Party (UK) MPs for English constituencies
UK MPs 1918–1922
UK MPs 1923–1924
Councillors in Leicestershire